Cossulus griseatellus is a moth in the family Cossidae. It is found in Pakistan and Afghanistan.

The length of the forewings is 12–13 mm. The forewings are grey, with a light marginal streak, bordering a light-grey submarginal area. The basal area of the wing is grey with a pattern of interrupted lines in the discal area. The hindwings are uniform light grey.

References

Natural History Museum Lepidoptera generic names catalog

Cossinae
Moths described in 2006
Moths of Asia